Haque  is a 1991 Bollywood political film directed by Harish Bhosle and produced by Mahesh Bhatt. It stars Dimple Kapadia, Aasif Sheikh, Sonu Walia, Anupam Kher in pivotal roles, with Paresh Rawal, Girija Shankar in supporting roles. India Today criticised the film.

Plot
Varsha has been brought up in an orthodox Hindu family, and has been taught to treat her husband as her God. When she marries influential politician, Bittu Singh, she decides to be the ideal Hindu wife and becomes his shadow, bowing down to his every command. When the time for election comes, Bittu prepares himself for an election in which he may become the Chief Minister of the State, while a pregnant Varsha prepares herself for mother-hood. When Bittu asks Varsha to accompany him to one of his speeches, she agrees to do so. On the way there they are attacked, their driver is killed, Bittu and Varsha are assaulted, and as a result loses her child. Bittu wins the elections and becomes the State's new Chief Minister, leaving Varsha in hospital to deal with her loss and mental agony. When Varsha recovers, she returns to Bittu, who now resides in a palatial home, and once she settles down, she demands that he bring their assailants to justice. A man named Shiva is arrested, he confesses, and is sentenced to several years in jail. Then Varsha meets with a young journalist named Sanjay, and it is this meeting that will change her life and her way of thinking forever, as well as bring her face to face with the very people who were responsible for the loss of her child.

Cast
 Dimple Kapadia as Varsha Singh
 Aasif Sheikh as Sanjay
 Sonu Walia as Alpana 
 Anupam Kher as Bittu Singh
 Paresh Rawal as Shiva
 Girija Shankar as Swami Hariprasad
 Mahesh Bhatt as Gurudev
 Rajendra Gupta as Editor Nandi
 Ram Mohan as Jailor

Soundtrack

References

External links
 

1991 films
1990s Hindi-language films
Indian political films
Films scored by Anand–Milind